Sanavand (also Romanized as Sanāvand) is a village in Dastjerd Rural District, Khalajastan District, Qom County, Qom Province, Iran. At the 2006 census, its population was 126, in 45 families.

References 

Populated places in Qom Province